Du'a Nudba is one of the major Shia supplications about Imam Al-Mahdi and his occultation. Nudba means to cry and Shias read the supplication to ask for help during the occultation. The supplication is recited during Eid al-Fitr, Eid al-Adha, Eid al-Ghadeer, and every Friday morning. Mazar al-Kabir, Mazar al-Ghadim, and Mesbaho al-Zaer were narrated the supplication. These books were written with authentic narrators such as Sayyed Ibn Tawus. Muhammad Baqir Majlisi wrote this prayer in Zaad-ul-Maad from Imam Ja'far al-Sadiq. Also, Albazofari, a person who lived in minor occultation, narrated from The Four Deputies of Imam Mahdi that Imam Mahdi said to read the prayer.

See also

 Dua Al-Ahd
 Dua Al-Faraj
 Du'a Kumayl
 Mujeer Du'a
 Jawshan Saqeer
 Du'a Abu Hamza al-Thumali
 Du'a al-Sabah

References

External links
Content of Dua Nudba

Islamic prayer
Shia Islam
Islamic terminology
Mahdism